Darko Mitrevski is a Macedonian film director currently living in Los Angeles, California, United States since 2007.

His list of feature films includes Goodbye, 20th Century!, Bal-Can-Can, and The Third Half.

References

External links

The Third Half (official website)

1971 births
Living people